The minister-president of Austria was the head of government of the Austrian Empire from 1848, when the office was created in the course of the March Revolution. Previously, executive power rested with an Austrian State Council, headed by the emperor himself, from 1821 under the chairmanship of State Chancellor Prince Klemens von Metternich. The office of minister-president was not refilled from 1852, when Emperor Franz Joseph resumed control of the government affairs, and was replaced by a coordinating chairman of the Austrian Minister's Conference.

According to the Austro-Hungarian Compromise of 1867, executive powers were divided between the emperor-king, the minister of the Imperial and Royal House and of Foreign Affairs as chairman of the k. u. k. Ministers' Council for Common Affairs, and the ministers-president of the Cisleithanian (Austrian) and Hungarian halves of the Empire. After the dissolution of the Austro-Hungarian Monarchy in November 1918, the head of government in the Austrian Republic since 1920 has been the federal chancellor.

Austrian Empire (1804–1867)

Ministers-president

Presidents of the Conference of Ministers

Austria-Hungary (1867–1918)

Ministers-president of Cisleithania

See also
 List of heads of government under Austrian Emperors
 List of foreign ministers of Austria-Hungary
 List of chancellors of Austria
 Minister-President

1848 establishments in the Austrian Empire
1918 disestablishments in Austria-Hungary

Ministers President
Ministers-President
Disestablishments in the Empire of Austria (1867–1918)